Beatrice Pons ( Posner; January 28, 1906 – June 17, 1991) was an American stage, radio, television and film character actress. She is best known for her recurring television roles on The Phil Silvers Show and Car 54, Where Are You? She appeared as "Mother" in the independent horror film Mother's Day under the name Rose Ross.

Life and career
Trained as a teacher, Pons began working in chorus and minor roles on Broadway in 1934.  She also had a
nightclub act doing impressions of famous actresses, comedians and singers. In the mid-1930s, she found work on radio, including the Dick Tracy series starting in January 1938.

Pons' first television appearance was on the NBC anthology series Goodyear Television Playhouse. She may be best-remembered for her recurring roles as Mrs. Emma Ritzik on the television sitcom The Phil Silvers Show and as Lucille Toody on the sitcom Car 54, Where Are You?, with her husband in both series played by veteran comedic actor Joe E. Ross. She also made appearances on the long-running American radio-turned-television series The Goldbergs, The United States Steel Hour, and the CBS prime time drama The Nurses.

In her later years, Pons began appearing in films. In 1964 she made her film debut in the comedy Diary of a Bachelor. In 1980 she played the role of "Mother" in the cult horror film Mother's Day, in which she chose to be credited as Rose Ross (her real-life husband's surname was Ross).
Her later film credits include Rachel, Rachel and Forever, Lulu.

Personal life
Pons was married to radio personality David Ross (born David  Rosenthal; July 7, 1891 – died November 12, 1975), by whom she had a son, Jonathan.

Pons died on June 17, 1991, aged 85, in New York City. She was buried in Riverside Cemetery, Saddle Brook, New Jersey.

Filmography

Film

Television

References

External links

 Profile, fanpix.net
 

1906 births
1991 deaths
Place of birth missing
American television actresses
American film actresses
American stage actresses
20th-century American actresses